Hongshi Cement (also called Red Lion Cement) is a Chinese cement manufacturer with numerous cement plants in China and a planned cement plants in Laos and Nepal.

Goldman Sachs owns a 25% stake in the company, having acquired it for RMB 600 million in a deal signed in 2007.

References

Cement companies of China
Companies based in Jinhua